Ozzano dell'Emilia is an Italian comune  in the Metropolitan City of Bologna, in northern Italy.

History
Its origins date back to the Roman Empire, when the town, which was located in what is now the hamlet of Maggio was named Claterna.

Twin towns
 Staffanstorp, Sweden

References

Cities and towns in Emilia-Romagna